Song Buhan (born 10 January 1997) is a Chinese sport shooter.

He participated at the 2018 ISSF World Shooting Championships.

References

External links

1997 births
Chinese male sport shooters
Living people
ISSF rifle shooters
Sport shooters from Liaoning
21st-century Chinese people